Ajitha Jayarajan is a Communist Party of India (Marxist) politician from Thrissur city, India. In November 2015, she became the sixth mayor of Thrissur Municipal Corporation.

References

Living people
Mayors of Thrissur
Communist Party of India (Marxist) politicians from Kerala
1965 births
21st-century Indian women politicians
21st-century Indian politicians
Women mayors of places in Kerala